Saint Molaise of Leighlin, also Laisrén or Laserian (died ca. 639), was an early Irish saint and abbot of Lethglenn or Leithglenn, now Old Leighlin in Co. Carlow, who is supposed to have lived in the 6th and 7th centuries.

Life
Born in Ireland and raised in Scotland as a young man, he lived the life of a hermit on Holy Isle (off the Isle of Arran). He later visited Rome as a pilgrim and was subsequently said to have been ordained a bishop there. He later entered the monastery at Old Leighlin in Ireland where he became abbot and possibly bishop. He adapted Church discipline in accordance with the practices of Rome. He is credited with introducing or advocating the Roman method of dating the celebration of Easter.

According to Kuno Meyer, he is the Laisrén who is depicted in the Old Irish prose narrative The Vision of Laisrén, one of the earliest vernacular pieces of vision literature in Christian tradition. The extant fragment shows him leaving the monastery of Clúain (possibly Clonmacnois or Cloyne) to 'purify' the church of Clúain Cháin (unidentified) in Connaught. After a three nights' fast, his soul is taken up by two angels, who escort him to Hell to show him the horrors that await unredeemed sinners. The angels explain to one devil eager to take Laisrén from them that their guest is granted the vision in order that "he will give warning before us to his friends."

Molaise probably died circa 639. His feast day is celebrated on 18 April. In a note added to the Félire Óengusso, Molaise is said to have pulled out a hair from St Sillán's eyebrow which had the special property that anyone who saw it in the morning died instantly. Having thereby saved others, Molaise died. Because of the fiery connection between sunrise and Molaise's name, from lasair "flame", the anecdote has been interpreted as relating to solar mythology. His monastery thrived and gave its name to the diocese established in 1111 at the Synod of Ráith Bressail.

See also
 St Goban — brother of Molaise of Leighlin and his predecessor as abbot of Leighlin.

References

Early Irish texts on St. Molaise

Short Old Irish text in the Book of Leinster and Book of Lismore about Molaise and his sister, tentatively dated to the early 10th century, ed. Julius Pokorny, "[Altirische texte:] Molaisse und seine Schwester." Zeitschrift für celtische Philologie 9 (1913): pp. 239–41. Available from CELT.
The Vision of St Laisrén (visionary text in Rawlinson B 512), ed. and tr. Kuno Meyer, Stories and Songs from Irish Manuscripts. London, 1899. Reprint from Otia Merseiana 1 (1899), pp. 113–28. Available from CELT. See also: Grosjean, Paul. "Un fragment des Coutumes de Tallaght et la Vision de Laisrén." Analecta Bollandiana 81 (1963): pp. 251–9.

Secondary sources
Chadwick, Nora. Studies in the Early British Church. Cambridge, 1958.

Further reading
Feeley, Joseph M. and J. Sheehan. "Old Leighlin monastery and cathedral, 5th to 15th century", Carloviana 52 (2003): pp. 9–15.
Hayden, Margaret. "The district of Leighlin Lasarian's country", Carloviana 2:29 (1981): pp. 4–6.
Kenny, Colum. "Molaise's water of truth." Carloviana 47 (1999). pp. 31, 36.
Kenny, C. "Old Leighlin after Laserian: division and reconciliation." Carloviana 47 (1999): pp. 22–30.
Kenny, C. "Molaise. Abbot of Leighlin and hermit of Holy Isle. The life and legacy of Saint Laisren in Ireland and Scotland". Morrigan Books, Killala, County Mayo. (1998)

7th-century Irish abbots
7th-century Christian saints
People from County Carlow
Medieval Irish saints
Medieval Scottish saints
7th-century Scottish people